Nyaydaata  is a 1999 Indian Hindi-language film starring Dharmendra, Jaya Prada, Harish & Ritu shivpuri .

Plot
Aravind and his friends embark on a trip to a forest but things take a turn when his friends go missing one by one. However, he gets into trouble when the police consider him as the prime suspect.

Cast

Dharmendra
Jaya Prada
Asrani
Harish Kumar
Tinnu Anand
Harish Patel
Ritu shivpuri
Mukesh Rishi
Baby Gazala		
Shidhart Anand
Ashrani

Songs
"Bheegi Bheegi Hai Hawa" - Sonu Nigam, Alisha Chinoy
" Haule Haule" - Abhijeet
"Is Dil Ke Khayalon Ko" - Kavita Krishnamurthy, Vinod Rathod
"Kahte Hai Tumse Pyar Ho Gaya" - Kavita Krishnamurthy, Vinod Rathod
"Kisi Se Hogi Pehli" - Kavita Krishnamurthy
"Preet Ka Deep Jhagmagaya" - Sadhna Sargam

External links
 

1999 films
1990s Hindi-language films
Films scored by Shyam-Surendar